Club Universidad de Chile is a professional football club based in Santiago, Chile, that plays in the Primera División.

Founded on 24 May 1927, Universidad de Chile is one of the most successful and popular football clubs in Chile, having won the league title 18 times. In the last 10 years, the team has been crowned champion six times, including their undefeated run to the 2011 Copa Sudamericana title.
The team has been associated with the colour blue throughout its history, blue is present on the logo, which was officially adopted in 1943. The club rivalries are with Colo-Colo and Universidad Católica, with whom they regularly contest the Santiago derbies known as Clásicos.

Despite not owning its stadium, the club usually plays its home games at the Estadio Nacional Julio Martínez Prádanos, in the commune of Ñuñoa in Santiago.

Universidad de Chile was the champion of the Copa Sudamericana 2011. In this tournament, the club had an excellent performance: wasn't defeated, won all their matches in Chile and had the top scorer of the tournament's history (Eduardo Vargas). Universidad de Chile has reached semi-finals in the Copa Libertadores four times (years 1970, 1996, 2010 and 2012).

History
The club was founded on 24 May 1927, as Club Deportivo Universitario by the merger of Club Náutico and Federación Universitaria. Initially, the club was formed by students of the Universidad de Chile and was the sport brand of the university until 1980 when the university's rector and president of the club at the time (both of them appointed by the Pinochet dictatorship) decided to separate the club from the university and created the CORFUCH to manage the football team. This move was a part of the atomization of the Universidad de Chile made by the military dictatorship to strengthen the private universities that were founded during that time and also to reduce state power. This was seen as a major blow to the club, as it was left with nothing but a loyal fan base. From then on, the club started to decline in terms of results on the field and lack of support from various sectors of the economy when other major clubs in Chile were helped by main powers such as the government, the catholic church, and Codelco. Eventually, the team's poor performances led to a relegation to second division in 1988, and threats to dissolve the club were made by the university if the team did not manage to return to the first division within a year. In 1989, Universidad de Chile were able to earn the 2nd division's championship, thus bringing them back to the first division, where they have remained since then.

Bankruptcy and Azul Azul
In 2006, the club declared bankruptcy and received an imposed administration that was criticized by the supporters, as the new chairman immediately fired club symbols and tried to transform the club into a private company of public stocks, being opposed to the decision of the club members in a previous assembly. The team finished the year with the worst campaign in the club history and the almost-sure transformation into private company due to the ties between the appointed chairman and several businessmen.

During 2007, the imposed administration gave the club into concession to a private group (Azul Azul). In 2008, the new university's rector agreed to enter a contract with the now private club, in which he allowed the use of the university's name and symbols in exchange for a royalty and the right to appoint two out of the eleven directors of the board.

Colours and logo

Home kit and away kit
The team's home kit from 1943 to 1958 consisted of a blue jersey, a white short and blue socks. In 1959, the home kit was changed to an all royal blue kit. In 1992 a darker tone of blue was used for the home kit and in 1996 a red stripe was added to the sleeves. The team's home kit saw its most drastic change in 2001–02 when red sleeves were included on the jersey; this kit retained the blue shorts and blue socks. In 2006, the team returned to the 1959 variation of its uniform and has not changed it since then. The current home kit features the classic red letter U on the front of the jersey.

From 1934 until 2001–02, Universidad de Chile's away kit consisted of a white jersey, shorts and socks, occasionally using blue shorts during the 1990s. In 2001–02, for the first time in the club's history a red kit was introduced; this kit consisted of a red jersey with dark blue sleeves, red shorts and red socks. In 2005, the club introduced a new all-red away kit, thereby dropping the blue sleeves in favor of red ones. The current away kit in a similar fashion to the home kit also features the red letter U on the front of the jersey. Universidad de Chile wore a kit that featured the regular royal blue jersey, white shorts and royal blue socks for a game against Chivas during the 2010 Copa Libertadores. At the end of 2010 the historical all-white combination made a return as the club's alternate kit.

Shirt sponsors and manufacturers

The chuncho logo
The team's logo, a red and white chuncho (Austral pygmy owl), has its origins in the days of the Club Náutico Universitario which gave its emblem to the Club Universitario de Deportes (CUD), when was founded in 1927. The logo was taken from Germany by Pablo Ramírez Rodríguez, who turned into a Minister of Exchequer in 1945. The chuncho was chosen for its association with wisdom, mutual knowledge, harmony of the body and soul.

The team's logo is not usually found on the team's uniform, being favored in turn by a red letter U with a white trim. The chuncho logo was absent from the team's jersey starting in 1979, but made a return during the 1996–97 season. Since 2006–07, a small chuncho logo could be found on the jersey along with the red U.

Achievements
Universidad de Chile's first title was won in 1940, just 3 years after their professional debut. The team won six titles (1959, 1962, 1964, 1965, 1967, 1969) between 1959 and 1969 and the became known as the Blue Ballet in reference the beautiful style of football they played. Nine members of that squad were part of the Chile national team that reached 3rd place in the 1962 FIFA World Cup, the best result ever achieved by Chile in a World Cup.

In 1995, Universidad de Chile won the cup once more, this time at home in front of almost 78,000 people in the Estadio Nacional. The team would then win back-to-back titles in 1999 and 2000.

More recently Universidad de Chile has won the Apertura in 2004, 2009, 2011 and 2014/2015, and Clausura in 2011 and 2016/2017. The 2011, the title was won at the hands of defending champions Universidad Católica, by a global score of 4–3, having lost the first leg of the final 2–0 and needing to win by a 3-goal margin, the team managed to win the second leg by a 4–1 score.

On the international stage Universidad de Chile have had a few of good runs in Copa Libertadores, reaching the semi-finals in 1970, 1996, 2010, and 2012.

On 14 December 2011, they defeated Liga De Quito from Ecuador 3–0 (4–0 on aggregate) to win the Copa Sudamericana, becoming the third Chilean team to win a South American tournament, behind Colo-Colo's 1991 Copa Libertadores and Universidad Catolica's 1994 Copa Interamericana. In the tournament, the club had an excellent performance (undefeated, and winning all their matches in Chile), and was nicknamed the "South America's FC Barcelona".

Also, the team was named the most successful chilean club of the 2010s, by winning a total of 9 titles in the whole decade. The achievement included 5 Primera División titles (2011 Apertura, 2011 Clausura, 2012 Apertura, 2014 Apertura and 2017 Clausura), 2 Copa Chile titles (2012–13 and 2015), the 2015 Supercopa and the 2011 Copa Sudamericana.

Records

Record Primera División victory — 9–1 v. Magallanes (1962)
Record Primera División defeat — 0–6 v. Colo-Colo (1938)
Record Copa Chile victory — 7–1 v. Audax Italiano (1984)
Most goals scored in Primera División — 184 Carlos Campos (1956–69)
Most Primera División appearances — 386 Leonel Sánchez (1953–69)
Most appearances overall — 539 Luis Musrri (1988–04)
Record Unbeaten Matches in Primera Division (National Record) — 33 (1999)
Record Straight Wins in Primera Division (National Record) — 16 (1963–64)
Record Best Start in Primera Division (National Record) 9 straight wins (2011)
Highest attendance in Primera Division  (National Record) — 85,268 v. Universidad Catolica (29 December 1962)

Honours

Domestic
Primera División: 18
 1940, 1959, 1962, 1964, 1965, 1967, 1969, 1994, 1995, 1999, 2000, 2004-A, 2009-A, 2011-A, 2011-C, 2012-A, 2014-A, 2017-C
Torneo Metropolitano: 2
 1968, 1969
Segunda División: 1
 1989
Serie B: 2
 1936, 1937

Cups
Copa Chile: 5
1979, 1998, 2000, 2012–13, 2015
Copa Francisco Candelori: 1
 1969
Supercopa de Chile: 1
2015

Continental
Copa Sudamericana
Winners (1): 2011
Recopa Sudamericana
Runner-up (1): 2012

International
Suruga Bank Championship
Runner-up (1): 2012

Supporters and rivalries 

Universidad de Chile is the  second largest following club in the country, with appromiximately 21% of the total Chilean football fans according to research and surveys from 2018, published in September 2021 by Spanish newspaper agency AS.com.

Created on March 24, 1988 from the split and subsequent re-foundation of the Imperio Azul barra, it occupies the south gallery of the Estadio Nacional where the team plays its home games. Its name is inspired by the initial location (below) of the young members of the former barra. It is considered one of the biggest barras in football, in Chile it is known as "La Número Uno" (Number One), as well as having great recognition in Latin-America. They feud with other barra brava groups, most notably Garra Blanca of Colo-Colo and Los Cruzados of Universidad Católica.

Chilean Superclásico 

Universidad de Chile's traditional rival is Colo-Colo, against which it plays the so-called Chilean Classic or Chilean Superclásico. Although the first confrontation between the two clubs dates back to 1935, the rivalry began to develop in the 1940s and 1950s, with the match played on 11. november 1959 being the climax of a series of disagreements between the two institutions. That match, valid for the definition of that year's title, ended with a 2-1 victory for Universidad de Chile, which was the first of a series of good results for the "Azules" over Colo-Colo. This, added to the dominance of Universidad de Chile in the national championship, only increased the rivalry. In recent years the rivalry between these teams has diminished, leaving Colo-Colo as superior to Universidad de Chile, and because of that, it has been considered as the "most unequal rivalry in the world."

Clásico Universitario 

There is often a rivalry between the two clubs from academic roots, where the game between Universidad de Chile and Universidad Católica is known as "Clásico Universitario". It is the oldest confrontation between two clubs from academic roots, as the first confrontation goes back to the University Classic of 1909. Rivalry, both in sports and in academic issues, made these matches between the universities become more and more important, eventually reaching the national status of "Universities' Derby".

This clásico has been recognized by FIFA as the most traditional of Chile. They met for the first time on 13 June 1937 in matchday three of the first Serie B at the Estadio Militar. These two teams have played twenty championship definitions against each other, Universidad Católica has won fourteen and Universidad de Chile six.

Players

First team squad

Youth Academy

Out on loan

2022 Summer transfers

In

Out

Player records

Individual honours

Primera Division top scorers
 Víctor Alonso: 20 goals (1940)
 Ubaldo Cruche: 17 goals (1945), 25 goals (1946)
 Carlos Campos: 24 goals (1961), 34 goals (1962), 21 goals (1966)
 Eladio Zárate: 25 goals (1971)
 Richart Báez: 10 goals (Clausura 1997)
 Pedro González: 23 goals (1998), 26 goals (2000)
 Felipe Mora: 13 goals (Clausura 2017)

Copa Chile top scorers
 Luis Alberto Ramos: 12 goals (1979)
 Marcelo Salas: 12 goals (1994)

Copa Sudamericana top scorers
 Eduardo Vargas: 11 goals (2011)

Chilean Footballer of the Year
 Sergio Navarro: 1961
 Pedro Araya: 1966
 Alberto Quintano: 1967
 Adolfo Nef: 1969
 Héctor Hoffens: 1989
 Patricio Mardones: 1994
 Pedro González: 1999
 Sergio Vargas: 2000
 Eduardo Vargas: 2011
 Charles Aránguiz: 2012

Primera División Footballer of the Year
 Juan Rodríguez: 1969
 Cristian Traverso: 1995
 Pedro González: 1999
 Sergio Vargas: 2000
 Miguel Pinto: 2009
 Eduardo Vargas: 2011
 José Rojas: 2012

America's ideal team
 Marcelo Salas: 1996
 Miguel Pinto: 2009
 Mauricio Victorino: 2010
 Eduardo Vargas, Johnny Herrera & Marcos González: 2011
 Matías Rodríguez &  Charles Aránguiz: 2012

Most appearances

Top scorers

Managers

Current coaching staff

List of managers

Average home attendances of Universidad de Chile

2016–17 Clausura: 33,466
2016–17 Apertura: 30,041
2015–16 Clausura: 19,641
2015–16 Apertura: 12,901

See also
Universidad de Chile
Los de Abajo
Ballet Azul

References

External links

Official website
Universidad de Chile in FIFA.com

 
Football clubs in Chile
Association football clubs established in 1927
Sport in Santiago
University and college association football clubs
1927 establishments in Chile
Copa Sudamericana winning clubs